The Captain from Köpenick is a 1926 German silent film directed by Siegfried Dessauer and starring Hermann Picha, Fritz Kampers, and Gerhard Ritterband. It is based on the case of Wilhelm Voigt.

The film's sets were designed by the art director Fritz Kraenke.

Cast

See also
 The Captain from Köpenick (1931 film)
 The Captain from Köpenick (1945 film)
 The Captain from Köpenick (1956 film)
 Der Hauptmann von Köpenick (1997 film)

References

Bibliography

External links

1926 films
German biographical films
Biographical films about fraudsters
Films of the Weimar Republic
German silent feature films
Films about con artists
Films set in 1906
Films set in Berlin
German black-and-white films
Cultural depictions of Wilhelm Voigt
1920s German films
1920s German-language films